Graphic Arts Monthly was a trade publication and web site owned by Reed Business Information serving the information needs of the printing industry, including printers and trade plants. Reed predecessor Cahners Publishing acquired Graphic Arts Monthly'''s publisher Technical Publishing in 1986.

The editor-in-chief was Bill Esler, with the editorial offices located in Oak Brook, Illinois, USA.
 
As the name implies, Graphic Arts Monthly had been published monthly since its establishment in 1929. Several common articles included Best Track, Ink Etc., Mail Call, and Sales Call.

In September, Graphic Arts Monthly published The Official Show Daily, which was produced on behalf of the Graphic Arts Show Company for the annual Graph Expo & PackPrint''.

As of June 2008, total BPA audited circulation was 70,100 subscribers.

References

BPA Worldwide

External links
Graphic Arts Monthly website

Business magazines published in the United States
Monthly magazines published in the United States
Defunct magazines published in the United States
Magazines established in 1929
Magazines disestablished in 2010
Professional and trade magazines
Magazines published in Illinois